Itxaso Uriarte Santamaría (born 1 September 1991) is a Spanish footballer who plays as a midfielder for Athletic Club.

Club career
Uriarte started her career at Aurrera Vitoria. Following ten seasons at Real Sociedad, she transferred to rivals Athletic Club on 2 July 2021. She debuted for Athletic in the opening game of the 2021–22 Primera División season, against Madrid CFF.

References

External links
 
 
 
 

1991 births
Living people
Women's association football midfielders
Spanish women's footballers
Real Sociedad (women) players
Athletic Club Femenino players
Footballers from Vitoria-Gasteiz
Primera División (women) players